Chris Okey Ezike (born 19?? in Anambra State) is a Nigerian law enforcement officer serving since 2015 as Commissioner of Police of the Rivers State Police Command. Before his promotion to CP, Ezike was Deputy Commissioner of Police (DCP) in-charge of Federal Special Anti-robbery Squad. He has headed the IG Anti-Crime Task Force in Edo and Kogi as well as the IG's Monitoring Unit of the Police Counter Terrorism Investigation Unit.

See also
Rivers State Police Command
Rivers State Road Traffic Management Authority

References

Living people
Commissioners of the Rivers State Police Command
People from Anambra State
Date of birth missing (living people)
Nigerian police officers
Year of birth missing (living people)